The Fares Scale of Injuries due to Cluster Munitions is an anatomical and neuropsychological classification method to identify and describe injury scales for victims of cluster munitions. It was published in 2013 by Lebanese physicians, Jawad Fares and Youssef Fares.

Elements of the scale

Interpretation
The scale assesses the severity of injuries resulting from cluster munitions based on functional impairment. Due to the polytraumatic nature of the injuries and the damage to multiple systems in the body, the scale stratifies cohorts by exploring the limitation in activity resulting from the injury. Following a grading system (I-IV): Grade I shows functional impairment of less than 25%, Grade II shows 50%, Grade III shows 75%, and Grade IV demonstrates more than 75% functional impairment. Grading is done after meticulous and conjoint assessment of symptoms and functioning.

History
During the 2006 Lebanon War, it was estimated that 4.6 million cluster munitions were released over Lebanese soil, almost one million of which remained unexploded. These unexploded ordnances continued to injure and kill civilians after the war ended. Injuries were  polytraumatic and often led to disability and significant neuropsychological effects. Research by Jawad Fares and Youssef Fares led to the development of the “Fares Scale of Injuries due to Cluster Munitions” to assess injuries based on functional impairment. The scale helped in classifying the wounds of victims and determining the best possible treatment.

References

 

Medical scales
Intensive care medicine
Diagnostic emergency medicine
Neuropsychological tests
Injuries
Medical assessment and evaluation instruments
Assessment
Disability